Beatriz Cordeiro Martins (born 15 May 1994) is a Portuguese trampoline gymnast. She competed at the 2015 European Games, where she won the women's synchronized bronze medal together with Ana Rente.

References

External links
 
 
 

1994 births
Living people
Portuguese female trampolinists
Gymnasts at the 2015 European Games
Gymnasts at the 2019 European Games
European Games bronze medalists for Portugal
European Games medalists in gymnastics
Sportspeople from Lisbon
20th-century Portuguese women
21st-century Portuguese women